Beth Armstrong may refer to:

 Beth Armstrong (Home and Away)
 Beth Diane Armstrong (born 1985), South African sculptor